Rolette can refer to:
 Jean Joseph Rolette, Joe Rolette the elder, fur trader
 Joe Rolette, fur trader, politician, Jean Joseph Rolette's son
 Rolette, North Dakota
 Rolette County, North Dakota